Samuel Cunningham (1862–1946) was a Northern Irish businessman and politician.

Samuel or Sam Cunningham may also refer to:

Politics
Samuel Cunningham (Canadian politician) (1848–1919), member of the Northwest Territories Legislative Assembly
Sir Samuel Knox Cunningham (1909–1976), Northern Irish barrister, businessman and politician, son of Samuel Cunningham (1862–1946)
Sam Cunningham (mayor), American politician, mayor of Waukegan, Illinois

Sports
Sam Cunningham (1950–2021), American football player
Samuel Cunningham (footballer) (born 1989), Thai footballer

See also
Samuel Cunningham House, an historic home located near Hedgesville, Berkeley County, West Virginia, United States